El Dorado is a 1963 film directed by Menahem Golan. The script was co-written by him, Leo Filler, and Amatsia Hiuni, based on the play by Yigal Mosenzon.

Plot
After a man is accused of a crime he did not commit, his lawyer is against taking the case and does nothing to help him.  Pressure politically is aiding in finding the man guilty, and he is forced to admit guilt.  He then fights to prove his innocence.

Principal cast

External links 

1963 films
Courtroom films
Films directed by Menahem Golan
1960s Hebrew-language films
Israeli drama films
1963 directorial debut films
Films with screenplays by Menahem Golan
Films based on plays